Wilbur Snyder (September 15, 1929 – December 25, 1991) was an American football player and professional wrestler.

Wrestling career
Snyder's wrestling debut occurred during football's 1953 off-season. He was trained by Sandor Szabo and Warren Bockwinkel in Southern California. In 1954, Snyder retired from football completely to pursue a full-time career in wrestling. Part of his in-ring persona included the use of many football tactics, and it garnered Snyder a lot of national attention. He had already been a regional champion in Montreal, Quebec, Canada when he made a name for himself by defeating Verne Gagne and winning the United States Championship at Marigold Arena in Chicago on April 7, 1956.

Snyder was a regional champion in a myriad of territories that were affiliated with the National Wrestling Alliance (NWA). One of those championships was an offshoot of the world title that he won from Verne Gagne on November 15, 1958 in Omaha, Nebraska.

After the departure of Jim Barnett, Snyder bought into the Indianapolis territory with Dick the Bruiser. The enterprise was known as Championship Wrestling Inc. on April 27, 1965. Snyder's wife Shirlee was listed as the registered agent. Snyder and Dick's mother, M.A. (Margaret) Johnston were listed as directors of the company, to keep the wrestler's ownership of the territory private.

The defeat of Mitsu Arakawa in September 1967 added the WWA title to Snyder's list of accomplishments. The victory resulted in a two-year run as WWA Champion for Snyder. Between 1956 and 1962, he was a ten time United States Champion. Snyder was also involved in long in-ring feuds with Dick the Bruiser and Hans Schmidt. Another accomplishment of Snyder's was his reign as 13-time WWA Tag Team Champion. During a tour of Japan in 1969, Snyder teamed with Danny Hodge to claim the Japan Pro-Wrestling Alliance's NWA International Tag Team Championship.

Snyder was often billed as "The World's Most Scientific Wrestler". On Bret Hart's greatest hits video Wilbur Snyder also gets a mention by Bobby "The Brain" Heenan and "Macho Man" Randy Savage. Heenan claiming Snyder basically invented the abdominal stretch.

Snyder's legacy was cemented by WWE announcer Jim Ross who would refer to "shades of the late Wilbur Snyder" anytime somebody used the abdominal stretch for most of the late 1990s and early 2000s.

Personal life

Wilbur married Shirlee Ann Hanson in 1948. His son in law is Steve Regal. He died on December 25, 1991, aged 62, in Pompano Beach, Florida.

Championships and accomplishments
 American Wrestling Alliance
 AWA World Tag Team Championship (Indiana version) (2 times) – with Dick the Bruiser
 American Wrestling Association
 AWA United States Heavyweight Championship (3 times)
 AWA World Tag Team Championship (2 times) – with Leo Nomellini (1) and Pat O'Connor (1)
 World Heavyweight Championship (Omaha version) (2 times)
Big Time Wrestling (San Francisco)
 NWA United States Heavyweight Championship (San Francisco version) (1 time)
NWA World Tag Team Championship (San Francisco version) (1 time) – with Nick Bockwinkel
 Fred Kohler Enterprises
 NWA United States Heavyweight Championship (Chicago version) (2 times)
 George Tragos/Lou Thesz Professional Wrestling Hall of Fame
 Class of 2014
International Wrestling Association (Montreal)
IWA International Heavyweight Championship (1 time)
 Japan Wrestling Association
 NWA International Tag Team Championship (1 time) – with Danny Hodge
 Midwest Wrestling Association
 NWA Eastern States Heavyweight Championship (1 time)
 NWA United States Tag Team Championship (Ohio version) (1 time) – with Dick the Bruiser
 NWA Detroit
 NWA United States Heavyweight Championship (Detroit version) (2 times)
 World Wrestling Associates/NWA Hollywood Wrestling
 NWA "Beat the Champ" Television Championship (2 times)
 WWA International Television Tag Team Championship (4 times) – with Sandor Szabo (2) and Bobo Brazil (2)
 NWA Western States Sports
 NWA World Tag Team Championship (2 times) – with Verne Gagne (1) and Pepper Gomez (1)
 St. Louis Wrestling Hall of Fame
 Class of 2014
 World Wrestling Association
 WWA World Tag Team Championship (14 times) – with Dick the Bruiser (3), Moose Cholak (3), Luis Martinez (1), Pat O'Connor (1), Paul Christy (1), Pepper Gomez (2), Dominic Denucci (1), and Spike Huber (2)
 Worldwide Wrestling Associates
 WWA International Television Tag Team Championship (4 times) – with Sandor Szabo (2) and Bobo Brazil (2)

References

External links 
 

1929 births
1991 deaths
American male professional wrestlers
Edmonton Elks players
Players of American football from Santa Monica, California
Utah Utes football players
Professional wrestlers from California
20th-century American male actors
People from Woodland Hills, Los Angeles
Stampede Wrestling alumni
20th-century professional wrestlers
AWA World Tag Team Champions
NWA "Beat the Champ" Television Champions
AWA United States Heavyweight Champions
NWA International Tag Team Champions